Juan Ricardo Lázaga (August 18, 1893 – death unknown), nicknamed "Agapito", was a Cuban first baseman in the Negro leagues and Cuban League in the 1910s and 1920s.

A native of Nueva Paz, Cuba, Lázaga made his Negro leagues debut in 1916 with the Cuban Stars (East). He played three seasons with the club, and another with the Cuban Stars (West) in 1922. Prior to his Negro league career, Lázaga had also played in the Cuban League for Habana and Club Fé.

References

External links
 and Baseball-Reference Black Baseball stats and Seamheads

1893 births
Place of death missing
Year of death missing
Club Fé players
Cuban Stars (East) players
Cuban Stars (West) players
Habana players
Baseball first basemen
People from Mayabeque Province
Cuban expatriate baseball players in the United States